{{Speciesbox
| image = Ophrys sphegodes flowers.jpg
| genus = Ophrys
| species = sphegodes
| authority = Mill.
| synonyms_ref = 
| synonyms = 
{{collapsible list|bullets = true
|*Arachnites aranifera (Huds.) Bubani 1901 
Myodium araniferum (Huds.) Salisb. 1812 
Ophrys araneola Rchb. 1831
Ophrys aranifera f. latipetala Chaub. ex St.-Amans 1821
Ophrys aranifera f. oodicheila Renz 1928 
Ophrys aranifera f. peralba G .Keller 1912 
Ophrys aranifera f. pseudomuscifera Ruppert 1917 
Ophrys aranifera f. purpurea A. Camus 1929 
Ophrys aranifera f. semilunaris W. Zimm. 1917 
Ophrys aranifera Huds. 1778
Ophrys aranifera ssp. litigiosa  (E.G. Camus) P. Fourn.
Ophrys aranifera ssp. araneola (Rchb.) K. Richt. 1890 
Ophrys aranifera subvar. bavarica Soó 1927 
Ophrys aranifera var. aurantiaca Beauverd 1929 
Ophrys aranifera var. euchlora J. Murray 1905 
Ophrys aranifera var. flavescens M. Schulze 1894 
Ophrys aranifera var. quadriloba Rchb.f. 1851
Ophrys aranifera var. rotulata Beck 1890 
Ophrys aranifera var. subfucifera Rchb.f. 1851 
Ophrys argensonensis J.-C. Guérin & A. Merlet 1998 
Ophrys argentaria Devillers-Tersch. & Devillers 1991 
Ophrys classica Devillers-Tersch. & Devillers 2000 
Ophrys cretensis (H. Baumann & Künkele) Paulus 1988 
Ophrys crucigera Jacq. 1784
Ophrys delmeziana P. Delforge 1989 
Ophrys exaltata ssp. mateolana (Medagli & al.) Paulus & Gack 1999 
Ophrys fuchsii W. Zimm. 1917 
Ophrys fucifera Sm. 1830 
Ophrys fuciflora Curtis 1778
Ophrys galeopsidea Lag. ex Colmeiro 1889 
Ophrys garganica O. Danesch & E. Danesch 1975 
Ophrys garganica ssp. passionis (Sennen ex Devillers-Tersch. & Devillers) Paulus & Gack 1999 
Ophrys garganica ssp. sipontensis (R. Lorenz & Gembardt) Del Prete 1984 
Ophrys gortynia (H. Baumann & Künkele) Paulus 1988 
Ophrys hebes (Kalopissis) E. Willing & B. Willing 1980 
Ophrys illyrica S. Hertel & K. Hertel 2002
Ophrys incubacea Bianca
Ophrys incubacea ssp. garganica (O. Danesch & E. Danesch) Galesi 2004
Ophrys insectifera var. arachnites  L. 1753 
Ophrys insectifera var. pallescens Moggr. 1869
Ophrys insectifera var. rubescens Moggr. 1869 
Ophrys litigiosa E.G. Camus 1900
Ophrys majellensis (Helga Daiss & Herm. Daiss) P. Delforge 1998 
Ophrys massiliensis Viglione & Véla 1999 
Ophrys mateolana Medagli & al. 1991 
Ophrys melitensis (Salk.) Devillers-Tersch. & Devillers 1994 
Ophrys montenegrina (H. Baumann & Künkele) Devillers-Tersch. & Devillers 1991
Ophrys negadensis G. Thiele & W. Thiele 2001 
Ophrys passionis Sennen ex Devillers-Tersch. & Devillers 1994 
Ophrys passionis ssp. majellensis (Helga Daiss & Herm. Daiss) Romolini & Soca 2000 
Ophrys provincialis (H. Baumann & Künkele) Paulus 1988 
Ophrys quadriloba (Rchb.f.) E.G. Camus 1908 
Ophrys riojana C.E.Hermos., J. Eur. Orch. 31: 881 (1999). Ophrys ruppertii A. Fuchs 1917 Ophrys sipontensis R. Lorenz & Gembardt 1987 Ophrys sphegodes f. latipetala (Chaub. ex St.-Amans) Soó 1971 Ophrys sphegodes f. pseudomuscifera (Ruppert) Soó 1971 Ophrys sphegodes f. subfucifera (Rchb.f.) Soó 1971 Ophrys sphegodes lus. aurantiaca (Beauverd) Soó 1971 Ophrys sphegodes lus. bavarica (Soó) Soó 1971 Ophrys sphegodes lus. euchlora (J. Murray) Soó 1971 Ophrys sphegodes lus. flavescens (M. Schulze) Soó 1971 Ophrys sphegodes lus. pallescens (Moggr.) Soó 1971 Ophrys sphegodes lus. peralba (G. Keller) Soó 1971 Ophrys sphegodes lus. purpurea (A. Camus) Soó 1971 Ophrys sphegodes lus. rotulata (Beck) Soó 1971 Ophrys sphegodes lus. rubescens (Moggr.) Soó 1971 Ophrys sphegodes lus. semilunaris (W. Zimm.) Soó 1971 Ophrys sphegodes ssp. araneola (Rchb.) M. Laínz 1983 Ophrys sphegodes ssp. cretensis H. Baumann & Künkele 1986 Ophrys sphegodes ssp. garganica E. Nelson 1962 Ophrys sphegodes ssp. gortynia H. Baumann & Künkele 1986 Ophrys sphegodes ssp. hebes Kalopissis 1975 Ophrys sphegodes ssp. litigiosa (E.G. Camus) Bech. 1925 Ophrys sphegodes ssp. majellensis Helga Daiss & Herm. Daiss 1997 Ophrys sphegodes ssp. melitensis Salk. 1992 Ophrys sphegodes ssp. montenegrina H. Baumann & Künkele 1988 Ophrys sphegodes ssp. oodicheila (Renz) Riech. 2004 Ophrys sphegodes ssp. passionis (Sennen ex Devillers-Tersch. & Devillers) Sanz & Nuet 1995 Ophrys sphegodes ssp. provincialis H. Baumann & Künkele 1988 Ophrys sphegodes ssp. tommasinii (Vis.) Soó 1971 Ophrys sphegodes var. argentaria (Devillers-Tersch. & Devillers) Faurh. 2002 Ophrys sphegodes var. garganicoides Balayer 1986 Ophrys sphegodes var. gigantea A. Fuchs 1917 Ophrys sphegodes var. subaesculapiana Balayer 1986Ophrys sphegodes var. subspruneriana Balayer 1986 Ophrys sphegodes var. subtommasiniana Balayer 1986 Ophrys tarquinia P. Delforge 2000 Ophrys tommasinii ssp. araneola (Rchb.) Soó 1980 Ophrys tommasinii ssp. litigiosa (E.G. Camus) Soó 1973 Ophrys tommasinii Vis. 1851 Ophrys vindelica W. Zimm. ex A. Fuchs 1928 }}
}}Ophrys sphegodes, commonly known as the early spider-orchid, is a species of sexually-deceptive orchid native to Europe and the Middle East. It is a very varied species with many subspecies recognised.

Description

Plant height varies with latitude. In the UK the maximum height is around 20 cm, but around the Mediterranean a height of 70 cm may be reached. Flowers March–May (April–May in northern latitudes). Each shoot may carry between 2 and 18 flowers.
The flowers have yellow-green sepals and a velvety red-brown labellum with a distinctive silvery-blue H marking so that the flowers much resemble an arthropod and especially a spider.

Similar to Ophrys fuciflora and Ophrys apifera but flowers differ in that late spider orchid and bee orchid have much smaller petals than sepals; in early spider orchid petals and sepals are a similar size. They are also distinguished by patches of colour on the labellum; late spider orchid has a yellow point at the centre of the distal end of the labellum, while bee orchid has a red patch at the proximal end of the labellum.

Distribution and habitat

Found on unimproved alkaline meadows, woodland edges, as well as slopes, banks and waste land. It is widespread across most of Europe and the middle East from Britain south to Portugal and east to Iran.

In Britain, it is restricted to parts of Dorset, Hampshire, Kent and Sussex and is regarded as rare although where it is found it may be in stands of many hundreds of plants. It is classified as a British Red Data Book plant. Despite its apparent vulnerability, it has very successfully colonised the chalk spoil dumping grounds created near Dover at Samphire Hoe from the excavations of the Channel Tunnel. Worldwide, the IUCN conservation status of this species is least concern as of 2018.

Ecology

In the UK Ophrys sphegodes is pollinated by the miner bee Andrena nigroaenea, a polylectic pollinator (i.e. one that visits many different species of flower), a bee species which requires dry sandy soils. Different subspecies have evolved to attract different pollinators.

This orchid species is able to form symbiotic relationships with a range of species of mycorrhizal fungi.

TaxonomyOphrys comes from the Ancient Greek for eyebrow, perhaps a reference to the velvety brown appearance of the labellum. Sphegodes comes from the Ancient Greek  for wasp-like.The Names of Plants This species was formerly called O. aranifera, meaning spider-carrying.

The genus Ophrys is the most species-rich (i.e. diverse) genus of orchids in Europe and the Mediterranean with over 200 species, according to 'Orchids of Britain and Europe' by Pierre Delforge.

Subspecies
Many subspecific and varietal names have been proposed. At the present time (May 2014), the following are recognized, one of them apparently originating as a hybrid between two of the others:Ophrys sphegodes nothosubsp. jeanpertii (E.G.Camus) Del Prete & Conte - France, Spain, Balkans (O. sphegodes subsp. araneola × O. sphegodes subsp. sphegodes)Ophrys sphegodes subsp. aesculapii (Renz) Soó ex J.J.Wood - GreeceOphrys sphegodes subsp. araneola (Rchb.) M.Laínz - Germany, Switzerland, France, Spain, Italy, Yugoslavia Ophrys sphegodes subsp. atrata (Rchb.f.) A.Bolòs - from Portugal to SerbiaOphrys sphegodes subsp. aveyronensis J.J.Wood - France, SpainOphrys sphegodes subsp. catalcana Kreutz - European TurkeyOphrys sphegodes subsp. cretensis H.Baumann & Künkele - Crete and other Greek islandsOphrys sphegodes subsp. epirotica (Renz) Gölz & H.R.Reinhard - Albania, GreeceOphrys sphegodes subsp. gortynia H.Baumann & Künkele - Crete and other Greek islandsOphrys sphegodes subsp. helenae (Renz) Soó & D.M.Moore - Albania, GreeceOphrys sphegodes subsp. mammosa (Desf.) Soó ex E.Nelson - from the Balkans to TurkmenistanOphrys sphegodes subsp. melitensis (Nyman) E.Nelson - the Maltese islandsOphrys sphegodes subsp. passionis (Sennen) Sanz & Nuet - France, Spain, Sardinia, Sicily, mainland Italy Ophrys sphegodes subsp. sipontensis (R.Lorenz & Gembardt) H.A.Pedersen & Faurh. - PugliaOphrys sphegodes subsp. sphegodes - from Britain and Spain to Hungary and the BalkansOphrys sphegodes subsp. spruneri'' (Nyman) E.Nelson - Crete and other Greek islands

Photo gallery

References 

sphegodes
Orchids of Europe
Orchids of France
Flora of Austria
Flora of Hungary
Flora of Switzerland
Flora of Albania
Flora of Bulgaria
Flora of Romania
Flora of Greece
Flora of Croatia
Flora of Serbia
Flora of Cyprus
Flora of Turkey
Flora of Iran
Flora of Syria
Flora of Palestine (region)
Plants described in 1768
Taxa named by Philip Miller